Banking in Iceland faced a crisis in 2008, which resulted in the government taking over three of its largest commercial banks.

The short-term liabilities of Icelandic banks in proportion to Iceland's GDP are 211%, as of 11 October 2008, or 480% of the country's national debt, and the average leverage ratio (assets/net worth) is 1 to 14.

History

Icelandic financial crisis 
In 2008, Iceland's three major privately owned commercial banks defaulted.

Major Banks

Central Bank 
 Seðlabanki Íslands

Major Commercial Banks 
 Landsbankinn 
 Íslandsbanki
 Arion banki
 MP banki

Investment Banks 
ALMC hf

See also 

 2008–11 Icelandic financial crisis

References